Mycaranthes oblitterata is an orchid found in Borneo and the Moluccas.

References

Further reading 
The Plant List

External links
 
 

oblitterata
Plants described in 1857